Ole Otto Paus (26 October 1910 – 6 April 2003), né Ole von Paus, was a Norwegian General, diplomat and NATO official. He was head of the army group in the military intelligence service of the exile Norwegian High Command in London during the Second World War, and thus was one of the founders of the Norwegian Intelligence Service. He served as a military attaché in Stockholm and Helsingfors during the 1950s, and was commander-in-chief in Central Norway from 1964 to 1971. From 1971 to 1974 he was Land Deputy of the Allied Forces Northern Europe, i.e. the Norwegian representative in the NATO military command for Northern Europe. As such he was the highest-ranking Norwegian in the NATO command structure at the time.

Background

He was born and grew up in Vienna, Austria-Hungary as the son of the Norwegian Consul-General in Vienna, Thorleif (von) Paus, and a Viennese mother of Jewish descent, Gabrielle ("Ella") Stein. On his father's side he belonged to the Norwegian Paus family and he was named for his grandfather, the steel industrialist and banker Ole Paus (who was a first cousin of Henrik Ibsen). He was a maternal grandson of the Viennese lawyer August Stein (1852–1890). August Stein left the Jewish Community of Vienna in 1877 and he and his children were baptized as Catholics in 1885/86. Ella left the Catholic Church when she married Ole's father. During his childhood the family name was officially spelled von Paus in Austria-Hungary, although the family sometimes used the spelling de Paus. The particle von in the country was a privilege of the Austro-Hungarian nobility and foreigners deemed to be of equivalent status; his father had moved to Vienna as a consular official and been registered under that name by the foreign ministry. The particle was banned by law in Austria in 1919, and after he had moved to Norway he was known as Ole Paus, as the family did not use a particle in Norway. He was the father of the singer Ole Paus.

Career

He graduated from the Theresianum in 1929. He subsequently moved to Norway at the age of 19. After learning Norwegian, he attended the Norwegian Military Academy and graduated as an officer in 1932. He graduated from the Norwegian Military College in 1938, from the Senior Officers' School in the United Kingdom in 1947, and attended the NATO Defence College in Paris in 1963.

During the Second World War, he joined the exile Norwegian High Command in London, where he served in the military intelligence service as head of the army group, in succession to Paal Frisvold.

In 1949 he served in the Independent Norwegian Brigade Group in Germany. He served as the Norwegian military attaché in Stockholm from 1953 and Helsingfors from 1954. In 1964 he was promoted to major-general; at the time only the King was a full general, the rank of lieutenant-general was rarely used and major-general was in practice the highest rank for most active-duty officers. He was commander-in-chief in Central Norway from 1964 to 1971. From 1971 to 1974 he was Land Deputy of the Allied Forces Northern Europe, i.e. the Norwegian representative in the NATO military command for Northern Europe (Denmark, Norway, Northern Germany and the Baltic Sea).

In 1973 he became a Commander of the Royal Norwegian Order of St. Olav, the Norwegian equivalent of a British knighthood.

Among friends and family he was known as "The General".

Military ranks
1932: Lieutenant
1943: Captain
1945: Major
1951: Lieutenant colonel
1956: Colonel
1964: Major general

Honours
Commander of the Royal Norwegian Order of St. Olav, 1973, for services towards the restoration of the Archbishop's Palace, Trondheim
Commander of the Order of the Sword, for services as military attaché in Sweden
Several others

References

1910 births
2003 deaths
Military personnel from Vienna
Norwegian Military Academy alumni
Norwegian Military College alumni
NATO Defense College alumni
Norwegian Army generals
Norwegian Army personnel of World War II
Norwegian Jews
Norwegian people of Austrian descent
Norwegian diplomats
NATO officials
Ole Otto
Norwegian military attachés
Commanders of the Order of the Sword
Norwegian people of Austrian-Jewish descent